Yalenzou  is a town and sub-prefecture in the Nzérékoré Prefecture in the Nzérékoré Region of Guinea. It is located southeast of Nzérékoré along the N2 road. The town of Nzao lies between Yalenzou and Nzérékoré.

References

Sub-prefectures of the Nzérékoré Region